Football 5-a-side at the 2017 ASEAN Para Games will be held at Malaysia National Hockey Stadium, National Sports Complex, Malaysia.

Medal table

Medalists

See also
Football at the 2017 Southeast Asian Games

External links
 Football 5-a-side games result system

2017 ASEAN Para Games
Football 5-a-side at the ASEAN Para Games
2017
2017 in Asian football